Deborah Havis Koss Chasanow (born April 23, 1948) is a senior United States district judge of the United States District Court for the District of Maryland.

Biography

Born in Washington, D.C., Chasanow received a Bachelor of Arts degree from Rutgers University in 1970 and a Juris Doctor from Stanford Law School in 1974. She was a law clerk for David L. Cahoon, Montgomery County Circuit Court, Maryland from 1974 to 1975, and was in private practice in Washington, D.C. in 1975. She was an Assistant state attorney general in the Office of the Maryland Attorney General from 1975 to 1987, and was chief of the Criminal Appeals Division from 1979 to 1987. She was a United States magistrate judge for the United States District Court for the District of Maryland from 1987 to 1993.

Federal judicial service
On August 6, 1993, Chasanow was nominated by President Bill Clinton to a seat on the United States District Court for the District of Maryland vacated by Alexander Harvey, II. She was confirmed by the United States Senate on October 18, 1993, and received her commission on October 20, 1993. She became chief judge in 2010, serving in that capacity until she assumed senior status on October 3, 2014.

In November 2015, Chasanow found that the Bladensburg Peace Cross war memorial did not violate the Constitution's Establishment Clause.  Her judgment was reversed by the divided Fourth Circuit, which was ultimately itself reversed by the Supreme Court in American Legion v. American Humanist Association (2019).

See also
 List of Jewish American jurists

References

External links
 

1948 births
Living people
Rutgers University alumni
Stanford Law School alumni
Judges of the United States District Court for the District of Maryland
United States district court judges appointed by Bill Clinton
United States magistrate judges
Lawyers from Washington, D.C.
20th-century American judges
21st-century American judges
20th-century American women judges
21st-century American women judges